Nam, Nam, or The Nam are shortened terms for:

 Vietnam, which is also spelled Viet Nam
 The Vietnam War

Nam, The Nam or NAM may also refer to:

Arts and media
 Nam, a fictional character in anime series Dragon Ball
 NAM (video game), a 1998 PC game
 The 'Nam, a Vietnam War comic series by Marvel

Organizations and movements
 NAM Aidsmap, a UK organization and website formerly named the National AIDS Manual and now often simply aidsmap
 National Academy of Medicine, of the US National Academies of Sciences
 National-Anarchist Movement, a radical, racist, anti-capitalist, anti-Marxist, and anti-statist ideology
 National Anti-crisis Management, a shadow government created in Belarus in October 2020
 National Arbitration and Mediation, a US dispute-resolution provider
 National Army Museum, a national museum of the British Army in London, England
 National Association of Manufacturers, an industrial trade association and advocacy group in the US
 National Association of Mathematicians, an association for mathematicians in the US
 Nederlandse Aardolie Maatschappij, a Dutch oil and gas company, owned by Shell and ExxonMobil
 New Age movement, a mid-20th century Western spiritual movement
 New American Movement, a former New Left socialist and feminist political organization in the US
 Non-Aligned Movement, of states not aligned with a major bloc during the Cold War

Science and technology
 N-Acetylmuramic acid, component of bacterial cell walls
 Negative electrode Active Material, surface layer of the negative electrode of a rechargeable battery
 Negative allosteric modulator, a type of allosteric modulator
 Nested association mapping, in statistical genetics
 Nicotinamide, a form of vitamin B3 found in food and used as a dietary supplement
 North American Mesoscale Model, a short-term weather forecasting model
 Northern Annular Mode, a climate pattern 
 Number Assignment Module, where phone number etc. is stored
 Network Access Module, a wall connection outlet with Ethernet network plugs

People

Given name
 Nam Kiwanuka (born 1975), Canadian television personality
 Nam Le (poker player) (born 1980), Vietnamese-American professional poker player
 Nam Yimyaem, retired judge of Thailand

Surname
 Nam (Korean surname)
 Leonardo Nam (born 1979), Australian actor
 Naomi Nari Nam (born 1985), American figure skater
 Eric Nam (born 1988), Korean American singer
 Nam Woo-hyun (born 1991), Korean singer

Places
 Namibia, country code
 Nam River (disambiguation)
 North America (N.Am.)

Other uses
 Nam Nam Alley, a lager-style beer brewed in Vietnam and sold in Australia
 Nam language, an extinct language preserved in Tibetan manuscripts
 Navy and Marine Corps Achievement Medal, US
 Network Addon Mod, for the game SimCity 4

See also

 
 
 
 Vietnam (disambiguation)